William L. Reilly (born February 28, 1943, in Long Branch, New Jersey) is an American steeplechase runner who competed in the 1968 Summer Olympics.

See also
List of Pennsylvania State University Olympians

References

1943 births
Living people
American male steeplechase runners
Olympic track and field athletes of the United States
Athletes (track and field) at the 1968 Summer Olympics
Sportspeople from Long Branch, New Jersey
Track and field athletes from New Jersey
Sportspeople from Monmouth County, New Jersey